Yaritza Abel Rojas (born August 26, 1983) is a judoka from Cuba.

References

External links
 
 

1983 births
Living people
Judoka at the 2011 Pan American Games
Judoka at the 2012 Summer Olympics
Olympic judoka of Cuba
Cuban female judoka
Pan American Games medalists in judo
Pan American Games gold medalists for Cuba
Medalists at the 2011 Pan American Games
20th-century Cuban women
20th-century Cuban people
21st-century Cuban women